The Superbe is a  river in Haute-Saône in Bourgogne-Franche-Comté, eastern France. It rises in Fontenois-la-Ville and  flows generally southwest to join the Saône at Baulay.

References

Rivers of France
Rivers of Bourgogne-Franche-Comté
Rivers of Haute-Saône